Clanculus berthelotii is a species of sea snail, a marine gastropod mollusk in the family Trochidae, the top snails.

Description
The size of the shell varies between 5 mm and 11 mm. The small shell has a globose-conic shape and is very similar in form to Clanculus corallinus. The five whorls are acutely granose-lirate. They are brown, below the sutures more or less maculated with blackish. The base of the shell is dotted with white. The body whorl is encircled by 11 sharply granose ridges, those of the base profoundly separated by deep grooves, wider than the ridges. The aperture is as in Clanculus corallinus, but the tooth at base of columella is more pointed and smaller.

Distribution
This species occurs in the North Atlantic Ocean (the Azores, Madeira and the Canary Islands)

References

 d'Orbigny A. D., 1839–1842: Mollusques, Echinodermes, Foraminifères et Polypiers recueillis aux Iles Canaries par MM. Webb et Berthelot et décrits par Alcide d'Orbigny. Mollusques; Béthune, Paris
 Thorson G., 1967: Clanculus bertheloti d’Orbigny, 1839: eine brutpflegende prosobranchiate Schnecke aus der Brandungszone von Teneriffa. Zeitschrift für Morphologie und Ökologie der Tiere 60(1–3): 162–175
 Gofas, S.; Le Renard, J.; Bouchet, P. (2001). Mollusca, in: Costello, M.J. et al. (Ed.) (2001). European register of marine species: a check-list of the marine species in Europe and a bibliography of guides to their identification. Collection Patrimoines Naturels, 50: pp. 180–213

External links
 

berthelotii
Gastropods described in 1840